Refugees is the seventh extended play by English alternative rock band Embrace. Released on 14 February 2014 by independent record label Cooking Vinyl, the EP was the first commercial release by the band in over seven years, the last being the "I Can't Come Down", released in December 2006.

Background
Said lead singer Danny McNamara on 13 January 2014, the day of Refugees' first radio airplay, "Richard brought this in as a near finished recording. It was one of the first songs we finished and it really set the bar for the rest of the album...To say we have argued over this song would be an understatement. I guess you know you've got a good one when that happens because everyone gets really precious about it. But it was really important to us that all the other tracks are strong too. We wanted to go back to how we were at the beginning when we released EPs and every track was as good as the lead track. It feels just like those days, we're all fired up and hungry for it because we've got it all to prove again."

Promotion
In the weeks leading up to the release of Refugees, the opening track, "Refugees", was released early on the iTunes Store on 14 January 2014.

Reception

Commercial performance
Refugees climbed to #2 on the UK iTunes album chart after its release on 17 February. Despite its commercial success in the United Kingdom, however, it was not eligible to chart in the UK due to the absence of a chart for extended plays under the Official Charts Company in the UK.

Track listing

Personnel
Adapted from Refugees liner notes.

Embrace
Mickey Dale – keyboards, string arrangements, backing vocals
Steve Firth – bass
Mike Heaton – drum kit, percussion, backing vocals
Danny McNamara – lead vocals, acoustic guitar
Richard McNamara – vocals, guitars, keyboard, percussion, production

Additional personnel
Nick Watson - mixing
Nathan McGrory - artwork
Glenn Hustler - "White noise illustration"

Release history

References

2014 EPs
Cooking Vinyl EPs